Edmond de Fels (1858–1951) was a French diplomat, writer and historian.

1858 births
1951 deaths
20th-century French non-fiction writers
French diplomats
20th-century French male writers